A list of films produced in the Soviet Union between 1950 and 1959:

1950s
Soviet films of 1950
Soviet films of 1951
Soviet films of 1952
Soviet films of 1953
Soviet films of 1954
Soviet films of 1955
Soviet films of 1956
Soviet films of 1957
Soviet films of 1958
Soviet films of 1959

Soviet
Films